Ofer Yaakobi (עופר יעקובי; born January 12, 1961) is an Israeli former basketball player. He played the forward position. He competed in the Israeli Basketball Premier League, and played for the Israeli national basketball team.

Biography
Yaakobi was born in Kiryat Shmona, Israel, and is 2.0 m (6 ft 7 in) tall. He was married to Israeli beauty queen Pazit Cohen.

He competed in the Israeli Basketball Premier League.  Yaakobi  played for Hapoel Gan Shmuel, Hapoel Holon, Hapoel Tel Aviv, Beitar Tel Aviv, Hapoel Gvat, and Maccabi Petah Tikva.

Yaakobi also played for the Israeli national basketball team. He competed in the 1983 European Championship for Men, 1985 European Championship for Men, and 1986 World Championship for Men.

References 

Living people
1961 births
Israeli men's basketball players
Hapoel Tel Aviv B.C. players
Hapoel Holon players
Israeli Basketball Premier League players
People from Kiryat Shmona